Easton Maudit is a small village and civil parish in rural Northamptonshire. It takes its name from the Maudit (or Mauduit) family who purchased the estate at what was then just Easton, in 1131. There was no residential landowner in the village until 1578 when the village was acquired by Sir Christopher Yelverton. At the 2011 census the population remained less than 100 and is included in the civil parish of Bozeat.

Thomas Percy was made the rector of the parish at the age of 24; he was a friend of Samuel Johnson, who was a frequent visitor to the Rectory.

Church

The church is dedicated to St Peter and St Paul.

The church floor was designed by Lord Alwyne Compton, Bishop of Ely, and includes the motto of the Marquesses of Northampton.

Samuel Johnson, Oliver Goldsmith, David Garrick and other members of the Garrick Club, were friends of the then rector and as well as staying in the village worshipped in the church. The chief monument is to Sir Christopher Yelverton, a Speaker of the House of Commons, who composed the prayer which is still said daily in Parliament. Yelverton's son Henry was Attorney-General to James I.

Outside the churchyard are the remains of a large oak tree - the shell of which is now artificially supported. The village and church feature in "The Hammer of God", the first episode of the 1974 Father Brown television series, starring Kenneth More.

Manor house

The village once housed a manor house. The house was purchased by the Compton family from Castle Ashby and they had the house demolished. All that now remains is the plot of the house surrounded by Lebanon Cedars.

Notable residents

Derek Nimmo the actor lived in Easton Maudit and is buried in the village graveyard.

Other information

There is a fine set of Roman remains in the village. There is a riding school at Manor Farm, and a small airfield.

References

External links

Website for the excavation of the Romano-British villa at Easton Maudit

Other village pictures

Villages in Northamptonshire
North Northamptonshire
Civil parishes in Northamptonshire